The Daniel Cassidy House near Mora, New Mexico was built in 1921.  It was listed on the National Register of Historic Places (NRHP) in 1990.

It was listed as part of a 1989 study of historic resources in western Mora County.  Dan Cassidy provided papers, photographs and/or other information to the study.

The related Daniel Cassidy and Sons General Merchandise Store, Cassidy Mill, and James J. Cassidy House, are also listed on the National Register.

See also

National Register of Historic Places listings in Mora County, New Mexico

References

External links
Family photos of Daniel Cassidy, Sr. and family

Houses on the National Register of Historic Places in New Mexico
Houses completed in 1921
Houses in Mora County, New Mexico
National Register of Historic Places in Mora County, New Mexico